The Roman Catholic Diocese of Vannes (Latin: Dioecesis Venetensis; French: Diocèse de Vannes) is a diocese of the Latin Church of the Roman Catholic Church in France. 
Erected in the 5th century, the Episcopal see is Vannes Cathedral in the city of Vannes. The diocese corresponds to the department of Morbihan, and is suffragan to the Archdiocese of Rennes, Dol, and Saint-Malo. Raymond Michel René Centène is the current bishop since his appointment in 2005.

History

In 1801, the diocese was expanded after the Concordat of 1802, to include part of the ancient Diocese of Saint-Malo, which was subsequently suppressed, after a three way split among the Dioceses of Vannes and Saint-Brieuc and the Archdiocese of Rennes.

In fiction

Alexandre Dumas makes Aramis the local Ordinary of the Diocese of Vannes in The Vicomte of Bragelonne: Ten Years Later, the last book of his d'Artagnan Romances.

Bishops of Vannes

to 1600
Amaury de la Motte d'Acigné † (1409 Appointed – 1 Nov 1432 Appointed, Bishop of Saint-Malo)
 1476–1490: Cardinal Pierre de Foix the Younger
 1490–1503 Lorenzo Cybo de Mari
 1504–1511: Jacques II. de Beaune de Semblançay
 26 February 1511 – 1513: Cardinal Robert Guibé
 30 July 1514 – 26 September 1531: Cardinal Lorenzo Pucci
 1531–1544: Cardinal Antonio Pucci
 1544–1548: Laurent III. Pucci
 1550–1557: Charles de Marillac
 1557–1558: Sébastien de L'Aubespine
 1559–1566: Philippe du Bec (also Archbishop of Reims)
 1566–1570: Jean Le Feuvre
 1572–1573: Pierre de Saint-Martin
 31 May–August, 1574: Jean de La Haye
 1574–1588: Louis de La Haye
 1592–1596: Georges d'Aradon

1600 to 1800 
 1599–1622: Jacques Martin
 1622–1646: Sébastien de Rosmadec
 1648–1671: Charles de Rosmadec
 1671–1687: Louis Casset de Vautorte
 1687–1716: François d'Argouges
 1716–1717: Louis de La Vergne-Montenard de Tressan
 1717–1719: Jean-François-Paul Lefèvre de Caumartin
Antoine Fagon † (29 Aug 1719 Appointed – 16 Feb 1742 Died) 
Jean-Joseph Chapelle de Saint-Jean de Jumilhac † (2 Apr 1742 Appointed – 17 Apr 1746 Appointed, Archbishop of Arles) 
Charles-Jean de Bertin † ( 1746 Appointed – 1774 Died) 
Sébastien-Michel Amelot † (10 Nov 1774 Appointed – 1801 Resigned)

since 1800 
Antoine-Xavier Maynaud de Pancemont † (9 Apr 1802 Appointed – 13 Mar 1807 Died) 
Pierre-François-Gabriel-Raymond-Ignace-Ferdinand de Bausset-Roquefort † (19 Nov 1807 Appointed – 8 Aug 1817 Appointed, Archbishop of Aix) 
Henri-Marie-Clauce de Bruc-Montplaisir † (27 Aug 1817 Appointed – 18 Jun 1826 Died) 
Simon Garnier † (28 Jun 1826 Appointed – 8 May 1827 Died) 
Charles-Jean de la Motte de Broons et de Vauvert † (4 Jul 1827 Appointed – 5 May 1860 Died) 
Louis-Anne Dubreil † (5 Jun 1861 Appointed – 24 Oct 1863 Appointed, Archbishop of Avignon) 
Jean-Baptiste Charles Gazailhan † (24 Oct 1863 Appointed – 1865 Resigned) 
Jean-Marie Bécel † (30 Dec 1865 Appointed – 6 Nov 1897 Died) 
Amédée-Jean-Baptiste Latieule † (22 Mar 1898 Appointed – 21 Oct 1903 Died) 
Alcime-Armand-Pierre-Henri Gouraud † (21 Feb 1906 Appointed – 2 Oct 1928 Died) 
Hippolyte Tréhiou † (15 Apr 1929 Appointed – 9 Jan 1941 Died) 
Eugène-Joseph-Marie Le Bellec † (11 Oct 1941 Appointed – 24 Sep 1964 Retired) 
Pierre-Auguste-Marie Boussard † (24 Sep 1964 Appointed – 16 Nov 1991 Retired) 
François-Mathurin Gourvès † (16 Nov 1991 Succeeded – 28 Jun 2005 Retired) 
Raymond Michel René Centène (28 Jun 2005 Appointed – present)

References

Bibliography

Reference works
 pp. 649–650. (Use with caution; obsolete)
  (in Latin) pp. 520.
 (in Latin) p. 264.
 p. 329.
 pp. 362.
 pp. 408.
 p. 436.

Studies

 second edition  pp. 375–379.

External links
  Centre national des Archives de l'Église de France, L’Épiscopat francais depuis 1919, retrieved: 2016-12-24.

Vannes
Morbihan
5th-century establishments in sub-Roman Gaul
Vannes